The 1919–20 Illinois Fighting Illini men's basketball team represented the University of Illinois.

Regular season
The 1919–20 Fighting Illini men's basketball season was the final of eight seasons for head coach Ralph Jones.  This group was slightly better than the previous as they bounced back from the first losing season of Jones' career and finished third in the Big Ten. The campaign began with a six-game home winning streak; however, over the next seven games, the team posted only three wins, while losing four. After Jones left Illinois, he went to Lake Forest Academy in Lake Forest, Illinois. He coached both basketball and football at the academy for 10 years. His football team won 76 games and lost six in his ten years. His basketball teams had a ten-year record of 94 wins and 9 losses. The record the Illini had at the conclusion of the 1919–20 season was nine wins and four losses overall with an eight-win, four-loss conference mark.  The starting lineup included captain K. L. Wilson, J. B. Felmley, Julian Mee and P. C. Taylor rotating at the forward positions, All-American Chuck Carney at center, and Charles Vail, Burt Ingwersen, and Laurie Walquist as guards.

Roster

Source

Schedule
												
Source																

|-	
!colspan=12 style="background:#DF4E38; color:white;"| Non-Conference regular season
|- align="center" bgcolor=""

|-	
!colspan=9 style="background:#DF4E38; color:#FFFFFF;"|Big Ten regular season	

			

Bold Italic connotes conference game

Player stats

Awards and honors
Chuck Carney was elected to the "Illini Men's Basketball All-Century Team" in 2004. Carney was also selected as an All-American for the 1919–20 season and became the Helms Foundation College Basketball Player of the Year for his play during the 1921–22 season.

References

Illinois Fighting Illini
Illinois Fighting Illini men's basketball seasons
1919 in sports in Illinois
1920 in sports in Illinois